Martina Amidei (born 8 April 1991) is an Italian sprinter. She competed in the 200 metres at the 2016 European Athletics Championships.

See also
 Italian all-time lists - 4x100 metres relay

References

External links
 

1991 births
Living people
Italian female sprinters
Place of birth missing (living people)
World Athletics Championships athletes for Italy
20th-century Italian women
21st-century Italian women